This is a list of parishes located in the Roman Catholic Diocese of Fresno, California.

Parishes

Merced/Mariposa Vicariate
Atwater
 St. Anthony

Gustine
 Shrine of Our Lady of Miracles

Hilmar
 Holy Rosary

Livingston
 St. Jude Thaddeus

Los Banos
 St. Joseph

Mariposa
 St. Joseph

Merced
 Our Lady of Mercy/St. Patrick/Sacred Heart

Planada
 Sacred Heart

Yosemite
 Our Lady of the Snows

Madera Vicariate
Chowchilla
 St. Columba

Dos Palos
 Sacred Heart

Firebaugh
 St. Joseph

Kerman
 St. Patrick

Madera
 St. Joachim

Mendota
 Our Lady of Guadalupe

Oakhurst
 Our Lady of the Sierra

Tranquility
 St. Paul

Fresno Metropolitan Vicariate
Clovis
 Our Lady of Perpetual Help/Divine Mercy

Easton
 St. Jude/Our Lady of the Assumption

Fresno
 Saint John's Cathedral                          
 Our Lady of La Vang                         
 Our Lady of Victory                            
 Shrine of St. Therese                                                  
 St. Anthony Claret                                         
 St Genevieve                                                                        
 St. Mary Queen of Apostles     
 Our Lady of Mt. Carmel
 Sacred Heart
 St. Alphonsus                       
 St. Anthony of Padua          
 St. Helen                                   
 St. Paul Catholic Newman   
 Holy Spirit

Fresno Rural Vicariate
Cutler
 St. Mary

Dinuba
 St. Catherine of Siena

Fowler
 St. Lucy

Kingsburg
 Holy Family

Orange Cove
 St. Isidore the Farmer

Parlier
 Our Lady of Sorrows

Reedley
 St. Anthony of Padua

Sanger/Del Rey
 St. Mary/St. Katherine

Selma
 St. Joseph

Kings Vicariate
Avenal
 St. Joseph

Coalinga
 St. Paul the Apostle

Corcoran
 Our Lady of Lourdes

Hanford
 Immaculate Heart of Mary/ St. Brigid

Huron
 St. Frances Cabrini

Laton
 Shrine of Our Lady of Fatima

Lemoore
 St. Peter Prince of Apostles

Riverdale
 St. Ann

Tulare Vicariate
Exeter
 Sacred Heart

Lindsay
 Sacred Heart

Porterville
 St. Anne/Holy Cross

Tipton
 St. John the Evangelist

Tulare
 St. Aloysius/St. Rita

Visalia
 Good Shepherd:
 The Nativity of the Blessed Virgin Mary
 Holy Family
 St. Charles Borromeo
 St. Thomas the Apostle, Goshen

Woodlake
 St. Frances Cabrini

Bakersfield Metro Vicariate
Arvin
 St. Thomas the Apostle

Bakersfield
 Christ the King
 Our Lady of Perpetual Help
 San Clemente Mission Parish
 St. Francis of Assisi
 St. Philip the Apostle
 Sacred Heart
 St. Elizabeth Ann Seton
 St. Joseph
 Our Lady of Guadalupe

Frazier Park
 Our Lady of the Snows, Mission

Lamont
 St. Augustine

Tehachapi
 St. Malachy

Wofford Heights
 St. Jude

Kern Rural Vicariate
Buttonwillow
 St. Mary

Delano
 Our Lady of Guadalupe/St. Mary of MM

Earlimart
 St. Jude Thaddeus

McFarland
 St. Elizabeth

Shafter
 St. Therese

Taft
 St. Mary

Wasco
 St. John

High Desert Vicariate
Bishop
 Our Lady of Perpetual Help

California City
 Our Lady of Lourdes

Lone Pine
 Santa Rosa

Ridgecrest
 St. Ann

Rosamond
 St. Mary of the Desert

References

parishes

Fresno
Culture of Fresno, California
Fresno